Dragoslav Jevrić (born 8 July 1974) is a Serbian retired professional footballer who played as a goalkeeper. He is currently goalkeeping coach at Riga FC.

Club career
Jevrić was born in Ivangrad, SR Montenegro, SFR Yugoslavia which is now Berane, Montenegro. He started playing with FK Ivangrad, and then with FK Rudar Pljevlja and FK Priština. before moving to Belgrade top-league sides FK Obilić and Red Star.

International career
He was a member of Serbia and Montenegro for the 2006 FIFA World Cup. Jevrić was the only player on the team born in Montenegro as Mirko Vučinić withdrew before the tournament due to injury.

He was called up by the newly formed Serbian national team for a friendly match against the Czech Republic on 4 August 2006 but he did not play in the match as then-coach Javier Clemente chose to use Vladimir Stojković instead. This decision upset Jevrić and led him to retire from international football.

International

Coaching career
In January 2022, Jevrić was appointed goalkeeping coach at Riga FC under new manager Thorsten Fink having worked with the German in the same role at APOEL.

Honours
 FR Yugoslavia Cup (3): 1996, 1997, 1999
 Toto Cup (1): 2008–09
 Cypriot Cup (2): 2010–11, 2011–12
 Cypriot Super Cup (1): 2010

References

External links

 
 

1974 births
Living people
Serbian footballers
FK Berane players
FK Rudar Pljevlja players
FC Prishtina players
FK Obilić players
Maccabi Tel Aviv F.C. players
Maccabi Petah Tikva F.C. players
Red Star Belgrade footballers
SBV Vitesse players
Ankaraspor footballers
AC Omonia players
Expatriate footballers in Israel
Expatriate footballers in Cyprus
Expatriate footballers in the Netherlands
Association football goalkeepers
Association football goalkeeping coaches
2006 FIFA World Cup players
Serbia and Montenegro international footballers
Eredivisie players
Süper Lig players
Israeli Premier League players
Serbia and Montenegro expatriate sportspeople in the Netherlands
Serbia and Montenegro expatriate sportspeople in Turkey
Serbian expatriate sportspeople in Turkey
Serbian expatriate sportspeople in Israel
Serbian expatriate sportspeople in Cyprus
Serbian expatriate sportspeople in Latvia
Serbs of Montenegro
Cypriot First Division players
Serbian SuperLiga players
Serbia and Montenegro footballers